Blaise Magyar, also Blaž the Magyar, was a military commander and officer of state in the Kingdom of Hungary in the 15th century. His military career started under the command of John Hunyadi. In the reign of John Hunyadi's son, Matthias Corvinus, he served as Ban of Croatia from 1470 to 1472 and in 1483, Ban of Slavonia from 1470 and 1471 and in 1483, Ban of Bosnia from 1470 to 1471, and Voivode of Transylvania from 1472 and 1475. He died in Kassa (now Košice in Slovakia) in 1490.

Notes

Sources

1490 deaths
15th-century Hungarian nobility
Hungarian generals
Voivodes of Transylvania
Bans of Croatia
Bans of Slavonia
Counts of the Székelys
Year of birth missing